Qian is a Chinese surname, pronounced Chin in Cantonese, and Chun or Cheon in Korean.

Origin

Lu (state)
In the state of Lu, the Ji (姬) family made the surname Qian (千) as the name of an ancestor.

Qiang people
Yang Teng (杨腾) is a general of the Qiang people, and a feudal lord of Cao Wei. He moved to Western Shu (西蜀), then changed his surname from Yang (杨), to Qian (千).

Ming Dynasty
In Ming Dynasty, some people got the surname from the Ming government.

Chinese-language surnames